Larry Robert Bigbie (born November 4, 1977) is an American former professional baseball first baseman and outfielder. He played in Major League Baseball from 2001 through 2006 for the Baltimore Orioles, Colorado Rockies, and St. Louis Cardinals.

Career
Bigbie attended Ball State University. In 1998, he played collegiate summer baseball with the Wareham Gatemen of the Cape Cod Baseball League.

Bigbie was drafted by the Baltimore Orioles in the 1st round (21st pick overall) of the 1999 Major League Baseball amateur draft and played over four years (–) for the Orioles before being traded during the 2005 season to the Colorado Rockies.

Bigbie played the remainder of 2005 season for the Rockies. On December 8, 2005, the Rockies traded him and Aaron Miles to the St. Louis Cardinals for pitcher Ray King. On February 2, 2007, he signed a minor league deal with the Los Angeles Dodgers. Bigbie exercised a free agent option in his contract on June 1, 2007, and on June 11 signed a minor league contract with the Braves.

During his six-year career, he had posted a .268 batting average, hitting 31 home runs and amassing 322 hits in 375 games. Bigbie is an average fielder, but has an above-average arm.

In December 2007, it was announced that he had agreed to a deal to play for the Yokohama Bay Stars of the Nippon Professional Baseball (NPB). The deal was signed in January, even after Bigbie's name appeared in the Mitchell Report.

Bigbie made a comeback for the 2010 season, playing for the Edmonton Capitals of the Golden Baseball League. Bigbie was named the DH for Baseball America's 2010 All-Independent Leagues Team.

Mitchell Report
He was named in the Mitchell Report on Steroid Abuse in Baseball on December 13, 2007. According to the report, Bigbie admitted to purchasing and using a variety of performance-enhancing substances from Kirk Radomski from 2001 to 2005, including human growth hormone, Deca-Durabolin, Sustanon, testosterone, and anti-estrogen drugs. Bigbie was introduced to Radomski through former teammate David Segui. Segui reportedly instructed him on "training regimens and the use of creatine, a legal muscle builder, before teaching him about steroids and eventually injecting him with Deca-Durabolin". After he started using steroids, Bigbie gained 30 pounds while maintaining a body fat percentage of 7%.

See also
 List of Major League Baseball players named in the Mitchell Report

References

External links

1977 births
Living people
American expatriate baseball players in Canada
American expatriate baseball players in Japan
Ball State Cardinals baseball players
Baltimore Orioles players
Baseball players from Indiana
Bluefield Orioles players
Bowie Baysox players
Colorado Rockies players
Colorado Springs Sky Sox players
Delmarva Shorebirds players
Edmonton Capitals players
Frederick Keys players
Las Vegas 51s players
Major League Baseball left fielders
Memphis Redbirds players
Nippon Professional Baseball outfielders
Ottawa Lynx players
People from Hobart, Indiana
Richmond Braves players
Rochester Red Wings players
Springfield Cardinals players
St. Louis Cardinals players
Swing of the Quad Cities players
Wareham Gatemen players
Yokohama BayStars players